The Chinese Puzzle is a 1932 British crime film directed by Guy Newall and starring Leon M. Lion, Austin Trevor, Lilian Braithwaite, Elizabeth Allan and Francis L. Sullivan.

It was shot at Twickenham Studios in London, controlled by the independent producer Julius Hagen. The film is based on the play The Chinese Puzzle by Frances Barclay and Leon M. Lion which had previously been made into a film The Chinese Puzzle in 1919.

Cast
 Leon M. Lion as Marquis Li Chung  
 Lilian Braithwaite as Lady de la Haye  
 Elizabeth Allan as Naomi Melsham  
 Austin Trevor as Paul Markatel  
 James Raglan as Sir Charles  
 Jane Welsh as Victoria  
 C. M. Hallard as Sir Aylmer Brent  
 Mabel Sealby as Mrs. Melsham  
 Francis L. Sullivan as Herman Strumm  
 Charles Carson as Armand de Rochecorbon  
 George Carr as Dr. Fu Yang

References

Bibliography
 Low, Rachael. Filmmaking in 1930s Britain. George Allen & Unwin, 1985.
 Wood, Linda. British Films, 1927-1939. British Film Institute, 1986.

External links
The Chinese Puzzle at IMDB

1932 films
1932 crime films
British black-and-white films
British films based on plays
Films directed by Guy Newall
British crime films
1930s British films
Films shot at Twickenham Film Studios
Remakes of British films
Sound film remakes of silent films